The 2017 Chrono des Nations was the 36th edition of the Chrono des Nations cycle race and was held on 15 October 2017. The race started and finished in Les Herbiers. The race was won by Martin Toft Madsen.

General classification

References

2017
2017 in road cycling
2017 in French sport
October 2017 sports events in France